Egbert Anson Van Alstyne (March 4, 1878 – July 9, 1951) was an American songwriter and pianist. Van Alstyne was the composer of a number of popular and ragtime tunes of the early 20th century.

Biography

Van Alstyne was born in Marengo, Illinois. After some time touring in Vaudeville he moved to New York City, initially working as a Tin Pan Alley song-plugger until he was able to make his living as a songwriter. He teamed with lyricist Harry H. Williams. Their first success was "Navajo" which was introduced in the Broadway musical Nancy Brown in 1903 and became one of the first records by Billy Murray early in 1904. Their best remembered song is In the Shade of the Old Apple Tree from 1905.

Other Van Alstyne hits included "Won't You Come Over to My House?", "I'm Afraid to Come Home in the Dark", and "Memories".

Van Alstyne shares credit with Tony Jackson on the hit "Pretty Baby". It was common for Tin Pan Alley publishers to add the name of one of their famous hit makers to tunes, and many have speculated this as being the main reason for Van Alstyne's name appearing on the piece, but Van Alstyne may have had a hand in writing or modifying the verse to Jackson's famous chorus.

He recorded a number of piano rolls.

Van Alstyne lived for many years in Chicago. He died there on July 9, 1951, and was buried in Memorial Park Cemetery in Evanston, Illinois.

Works, 1900–1920

Awards and honors
He was inducted into Songwriters Hall of Fame in 1970.

References

Further reading
 Charosh, Paul, and Robert A. Fremont. Song Hits from the Turn of the Century: Complete Original Sheet Music for 25 Songs. New York : Dover Publications, 1983.  
 Evans, P., and P. Lavender. Music for the Millennium: The Twenties A Century of Popular Song. London: Wise Publications, 1997.  
 Ewen, David. Popular American Composers from Revolutionary Times to the Present; A Biographical and Critical Guide.  New York: H. W. Wilson Co, 1962. 
 Jasen, David A. Ragtime Gems: Original Sheet Music for 25 Ragtime Classics. New York: Dover, 1986.  
 Songs with Music by Egbert Van Alstyne: Pretty Baby, in the Shade of the Old Apple Tree. [S.l.]: General Books, 2010.  
 Studwell, William E. They Also Wrote: Evaluative Essays on Lesser-Known Popular American Songwriters Prior to the Rock Era. Lanham, MD: Scarecrow Press, 2000.  
 Van Alstyne, Egbert, A. J. Mills, Harry Castling, Walter Emerson, and Fred Hallam. In the Shade of the Old Apple Tree: Parody. London: Francis, Day & Hunter, 1906. 
 Van Alstyne, Egbert, and Gene Arnold. My Prayer for Today. [S.l.]: M. Witmark & Sons, 1949.

External links

 Digital image of "On the Road to Home Sweet Home" in the Duke University Libraries Digital Collections
 "I'm Goin' Back to Oklahoma" in the Lilly Library Sheet Music Collection, Indiana University
 List of works by Egbert Van Alstyne in the Baylor University Libraries Digital Collections

 
 
 Egbert Anson Van Alstyne biography by Bill Edwards at Ragpiano.com
 Egbert Van Alstyne, Tin Pan Alley Pioneer
 Egbert Van Alstyne in the National Jukebox
 Egbert Van Alstyne recordings at the Discography of American Historical Recordings.

1878 births
1951 deaths
Songwriters from Illinois
American keyboardists
Vaudeville performers
People from Marengo, Illinois